Strength and Honour is a 2008 Irish sports drama film written, produced and directed by Mark Mahon. It was shot in Cork, Ireland. Filming took place in the city and county including Kinsale, Rochestown, Passage West and the un-opened maternity ward of the Cork University Hospital as well as the new airport.

The film had its market premiere preview screening at the Cannes Film Festival in May 2007, and won the "Best Picture" and "Best Actor" awards at the Boston Film Festival.

It was released on 20 November 2007 in Ireland and was market tested on a limited capacity in the United States on 7 December 2007. It was given a 15A rating in Ireland.
After the US testing, the film was re-cut taking 13 minutes off it and the film was fully completed in 2008.

In 2009, the Film was selected to screen at the Writers Guild of America and received a review in the Los Angeles Times that described it as 'another Slumdog Millionaire'. Later the same year, Michael Madsen and Mark Mahon appeared on the TODAY show in New York, as there was such strong word of mouth about the film.

On 17 March 2010, Mark Mahon and the film's main cast were invited by Prince Albert of Monaco to a private Royal screening at the Palace of Monaco.

The film's tagline was: "Wounds Heal, Scars Fade, Glory is Forever".

Plot 
Strength and Honour tells the story of an Irish-American boxer, Sean Kelleher (Michael Madsen), who accidentally kills his friend in the ring and promises his wife that he will never box again. However, years later, when he discovers that his only son is dying of the same hereditary heart disorder which has taken his wife, he is forced to break his promise to raise the substantial funds needed for the surgery that could save his son’s life.

Cast
 Michael Madsen as Sean Kelleher
 Vinnie Jones as "Smasher" O'Driscoll
 Patrick Bergin as "Papa Boss"
 Richard Chamberlain as Denis O'Leary
 Gail Fitzpatrick as "Mammy" McGrath
 Michael Rawley as "Chaser" McGrath
 Michael Kelleher Jr. as Luke Whelton
 Chosky Boss as Finbar Furey
 Coco McGrath as Sheridan Mahon
 Baby McGrath as Krystal Mahon
 Barry Leacy as Myles Horgan
 Fixer Ward as Michael Galvin
 Gary Cashman as "Blackie"

Reception

The film initially received negative reviews on both its test American and Irish releases. It was released on 20 November 2007 in Ireland and was market tested on a limited capacity in the United States on 7 December 2007. Mark Mahon was nominated for an I.F.T.A. (Irish Film and Television Academy Award) for his efforts. It was given a 15A rating in Ireland. After the US testing, the film was re-cut taking 13 minutes off it, and the film was fully completed in 2008. It then became a film festival favorite and built a significant fan base.

Awards
It then went on to win the following awards:

 won the "Best Picture" and "Best Actor" awards at the Boston Film Festival
 Winner – Festival Prize – 23rd Boston Film Festival
 Winner – Best Feature – 23rd Boston Film Festival
 Winner – Michael Madsen, Best Actor – 23rd Boston Film Festival
 Winner – Best Feature – 2008 Downtown Los Angeles Film Festival 
 Winner – Michael Madsen, Best Actor – 2008 Downtown Los Angeles Film Festival
 Winner – Best Feature – 2008 New York International Film Festival 
 Winner – Best Director – 2008 New York International Film Festival 
 Winner – Michael Madsen, Best Actor – 2008 New York International Film Festival
 Winner – Best Score – 2008 New York International Film Festival 
 Winner – 56th Annual Columbus International Film Festival (Chris Awards)
 Winner – Best American Independent Feature – 2008 Mount Shasta International Film Festival 
 Winner – Best Performance in a Feature – 2008 Mount Shasta International Film Festival 
 Winner – Best Foreign Feature – 2008 International Action On Film Festival
 Winner – Best Director – 2008 International Action On Film Festival
 Winner – Best Screenplay – 2008 Alan J. Bailey Excellence Award 
 Winner – Best Supporting Actor – 2008 Alan J. Bailey Excellence Award 
 Winner – Best Soundtrack – 2008 Malibu International Film Festival 
 Winner – Best Picture – 2008 Apra Foundation for Film, Music and Art (AFFMA) 
 Winner – Best Director – 2008 23rd Fort Lauderdale International Film Festival 
 Writers Guild of America Selection in Pete Hammond’s Screening Series
 Winner – Best Picture – 2009 Aurora Awards
 Winner – Best Picture – 2009 Moscow Sports Film Festival

Strength and Honour also had official selections from several film festivals, including selections at several non-competitive festivals such as Cairo, Cambridge, Portugal, Moscow, Rome, Seville and Shanghai. The film was also selected by the Beijing Olympics Committee for their Sports Film Screening Week in 2008.

References

External links

Official Strength And Honour website

2008 films
2008 drama films
2000s sports drama films
Films scored by Ilan Eshkeri
Films shot in County Cork
Irish boxing films
Irish sports drama films
2000s English-language films